The Ecumenical Patriarchate of Constantinople ("Roman Orthodox Patriarchate, Ecumenical Patriarchate") is one of the fifteen to seventeen autocephalous churches (or "jurisdictions") that together compose the Eastern Orthodox Church. It is headed by the Ecumenical Patriarch of Constantinople, currently Bartholomew, Archbishop of Constantinople.

Because of its historical location as the capital of the former Eastern Roman (Byzantine) Empire and its role as the mother church of most modern Orthodox churches, Constantinople holds a special place of honor within Orthodoxy and serves as the seat for the Ecumenical Patriarch, who enjoys the status of primus inter pares (first among equals) among the world's Eastern Orthodox prelates and is regarded as the representative and spiritual leader of Eastern Orthodox Christians.

The status  of Ecumenical Patriarchate is not officially recognized by the Republic of Turkey; Turkey only recognises the authority of the Ecumenical Patriarchate over the Greek minority in Istanbul, Bozcaada and Gökçeada.

The Ecumenical Patriarchate promotes the expansion of the Christian faith and Eastern Orthodox doctrine, and the Ecumenical Patriarchs are involved in ecumenism and interfaith dialogue, charitable work, and the defense of Orthodox Christian traditions. Prominent issues for the Ecumenical Patriarchate's policy in the 21st century include the safety of the believers in the Middle East, reconciliation of the Eastern Orthodox and Catholic churches, and the reopening of the Theological School of Halki, which was closed down by the Turkish authorities in 1971.

History

The Great Church of Christ

Christianity in the Greek city of Byzantium was brought by Apostle Andrew himself who visited Byzantium, founded the See of Byzantium in 38 AD and appointed the bishop Stachys the Apostle who remained until 54 AD. Therefore, the Greek Ecumenical Patriarchate of Constantinople claims its legitimate appointment from Apostle Andrew from whom the subsequent ordination of ministries claim legitimate inheritance through the sacrament of Holy Orders.

In the year 330 the Roman Emperor Constantine the Great moved his residence to the town renaming it Nova Roma, or "New Rome." Thenceforth, the importance of the church there grew, along with the influence of its bishop.

Prior to the moving of the imperial capital, the bishop of Byzantium had been under the authority of the metropolitan of Heraclea, but from the 4th century on, he grew to become independent in his own right and even to exercise authority throughout what is now Greece, Asia Minor, Pontus, and Thrace. With the development of the hierarchical structure of the Church, the bishop of Constantinople came to be styled as exarch (a position superior to metropolitan). Constantinople was recognized as the fourth patriarchate at the First Council of Constantinople in 381, after Antioch, Alexandria, and Rome. The patriarch was usually appointed by Antioch.

Because of the importance of the position of Constantinople's church at the center of the Roman Empire, affairs involving the various churches outside Constantinople's direct authority came to be discussed in the capital, particularly where the intervention of the emperor was desired. The patriarch naturally became a liaison between the emperor and bishops traveling to the capital, thus establishing the position of the patriarch as one involving the unity of the whole Church, particularly in the East.

In turn, the affairs of the Constantinopolitan church were overseen not just by the patriarch, but also by synods held including visiting bishops. The resident synod not only governed the business of the patriarchate but also examined questions pertinent to the whole Church as well as the eastern half of the old empire.

As the Roman Empire stabilized and grew, so did the influence of the patriarchate at its capital. This influence came to be enshrined in Orthodox canon law, to such an extent that it was elevated even beyond more ancient patriarchates: Canon 3 of the First Council of Constantinople (381) stated that the bishop of that city "shall have primacy of honor after the Bishop of Rome because Constantinople is the New Rome."

In its disputed 28th Canon, the Council of Chalcedon in 451 recognized an expansion of the boundaries of the Patriarchate of Constantinople and of its authority over bishops of dioceses "among the barbarians", which has been variously interpreted as referring either to areas outside the Byzantine Empire or to non-Greeks. The council resulted in a schism with the Patriarchate of Alexandria.

In any case, for almost a thousand years the Patriarch of Constantinople presided over the church in the Eastern Roman (Byzantine) Empire and its missionary activity that brought the Christian faith in its Byzantine form to many peoples north of the imperial borders. The cathedral church of Constantinople, Hagia Sophia (Holy Wisdom), was the center of religious life in the eastern Christian world.

The Ecumenical Patriarchate came to be called the "Great Church of Christ" and it was the touchstone and reference point for ecclesiastical affairs in the East, whether in terms of church government, relations with the state, or liturgical matters.

Prerogatives of the Ecumenical Patriarchate
In history and in canonical literature (i.e. the Church's canons and traditional commentaries on them), the Ecumenical Patriarchate has been granted certain prerogatives that other autocephalous Orthodox churches do not have. Not all of these prerogatives are today universally acknowledged, though all do have precedents in history and canonical references. The following is a (non-exhaustive) list of these prerogatives and their reference points:

 Equal prerogatives to Old Rome (Canon 28 of the Fourth Ecumenical Council, Canon 36 of the Quinisext Council);
 The right to hear appeals, if invited, regarding disputes between clergy (Canons 9 and 17 of the Fourth Ecumenical Council);
 The right to ordain bishops for areas outside defined canonical boundaries (Canon 28 of the Fourth Ecumenical Council);
 The right to establish stavropegial monasteries even in the territories of other patriarchates (the Epanagoge, commentaries of Matthew Blastares and Theodore Balsamon)

Iconoclast controversy

In the eighth and ninth centuries the iconoclast movement caused serious political unrest throughout the Empire. The emperor Leo III issued a decree in 726 against images and ordered the destruction of an image of Christ over one of the doors of the Chalke, an act which was fiercely resisted by the citizens. Constantine V convoked a church council in 754, which condemned the worship of images, after which many treasures were broken, burned, or painted over with depictions of trees, birds or animals: one source refers to the church of the Holy Virgin at Blachernae as having been transformed into a "fruit store and aviary". Following the death of his son Leo IV in 780, the empress Irene restored the veneration of images through the agency of the Second Council of Nicaea in 787.

The iconoclast controversy returned in the early 9th century, only to be resolved once more in 843 during the regency of Empress Theodora, who restored the icons.

Great Schism of 1054

The relations between the papacy and the Byzantine court were good in the years leading up to 1054. The emperor Constantine IX and the Pope Leo IX were allied through the mediation of the Lombard catepan of Italy, Argyrus, who had spent years in Constantinople, originally as a political prisoner.

Patriarch Michael I Cerularius ordered a letter to be written to John, the Bishop of Trani in which he attacked the "Judaistic" practices of the West, namely the use of unleavened bread. The letter was to be sent by John to all the bishops of the West, including the Pope. John promptly complied and the letter was passed to Humbert of Mourmoutiers, the cardinal-bishop of Silva Candida, who translated the letter into Latin and brought it to the Pope, who ordered a reply to be made to each charge and a defence of papal supremacy to be laid out in a response.

Although he was hot-headed, Michael was convinced to cool the debate and thus attempt to prevent the impending breach. However, Humbert and the pope made no concessions and the former was sent with legatine powers to the imperial capital to solve the questions raised once and for all. Humbert, Frederick of Lorraine, and Peter, Archbishop of Amalfi, arrived in April 1054 and were met with a hostile reception; they stormed out of the palace, leaving the papal response with Michael, who in turn was even more angered by their actions. The patriarch refused to recognise their authority or, practically, their existence. When Pope Leo died on April 19, 1054, the legates' authority legally ceased, but they effectively ignored this technicality.

In response to Michael's refusal to address the issues at hand, the legatine mission took the extreme measure of entering the church of the Hagia Sophia during the Divine Liturgy and placing a bull of excommunication on the altar.

The events of the East-West Schism are generally dated from the acts of 1054. However, these events only triggered the beginning of the schism. The full schism was not actually consummated by the seemingly mutual excommunications. The New Catholic Encyclopedia reports that the legates had been careful not to intimate that the bull of excommunication implied a general excommunication of the Byzantine Church. The bull excommunicated only Cerularius, Leo of Achrida, and their adherents. Thus, the New Catholic Encyclopedia argues that the dispute need not have produced a permanent schism any more than excommunication of any "contumacious bishop". The schism began to develop when all the other Eastern patriarchs supported Cerularius. According to the New Catholic Encyclopedia, it was the support of Emperor Michael VI Stratiotikos that impelled them to support Cerularius. Some have questioned the validity of the bull on the grounds that Pope Leo IX had died at that time and so the authority of the legates to issue such a bull is unclear.

The legates left for Rome two days after issuing the bull of excommunication, leaving behind a city near riot. The patriarch had the immense support of the people against the emperor, who had supported the legates to his own detriment. To assuage popular anger, the bull was burnt, and the legates were anathematised. Only the legates were anathematised and, in this case too, there was no explicit indication that the entire Western church was being anathematised.

In the bull of excommunication issued against Patriarch Michael I Cerularius by the papal legates, one of the reasons cited was the alleged deletion by the Eastern Church of the "Filioque" from the original Nicene Creed. In fact, it was precisely the opposite: the Eastern Church had not deleted anything; it was the Western Church that had added this phrase to the Nicene-Constantinopolitan Creed.

As Bishop Kallistos Ware writes, "Even after 1054 friendly relations between East and West continued. The two parts of Christendom were not yet conscious of a great gulf of separation between them. […] The dispute remained something of which ordinary Christians in East and West were largely unaware". In fact, efforts were made in subsequent centuries by Popes and Patriarchs to heal the rift between the churches. However, a number of factors and historical events worked to widen the separation over time.

Fall of Constantinople in 1204 and the exile in Nicaea

The Fourth Crusade in exchange for promised funds attempted to help the deposed emperor Alexius IV regain his throne. After taking Constantinople, returning Alexius IV to the throne, the revolt against and murder of Alexius IV left the Crusaders without payment. On 12 April 1204, the crusaders inflicted a severe sacking on Constantinople for three days, during which many ancient and medieval Roman and Greek works were either stolen or destroyed. Despite their oaths and the threat of excommunication, the Crusaders ruthlessly and systematically violated the city's holy sanctuaries, destroying, defiling, or stealing all they could lay hands on; nothing was spared. It was said that the total amount looted from Constantinople was about 900,000 silver marks. The Venetians received 150,000 silver marks that was their due, while the Crusaders received 50,000 silver marks. A further 100,000 silver marks were divided evenly up between the Crusaders and Venetians. The remaining 500,000 silver marks were secretly kept back by many Crusader knights.

Nicetas Choniates gives a vivid account of the sack of Constantinople by the Frankish and Venetian Crusaders of the Fourth Crusade:

The Latin soldiery subjected the greatest city in Europe to an indescribable sack. For three days they murdered, raped, looted and destroyed on a scale which even the ancient Vandals and Goths would have found unbelievable. Constantinople had become a veritable museum of ancient and Byzantine art, an emporium of such incredible wealth that the Latins were astounded at the riches they found. Though the Venetians had an appreciation for the art which they discovered (they were themselves semi-Byzantines) and saved much of it, the French and others destroyed indiscriminately, halting to refresh themselves with wine, violation of nuns, and murder of Orthodox clerics. The Crusaders vented their hatred for the Greeks most spectacularly in the desecration of the greatest Church in Christendom. They smashed the silver iconostasis, the icons and the holy books of Hagia Sophia, and seated upon the patriarchal throne a whore who sang coarse songs as they drank wine from the Church's holy vessels. The estrangement of East and West, which had proceeded over the centuries, culminated in the horrible massacre that accompanied the conquest of Constantinople. The Greeks were convinced that even the Turks, had they taken the city, would not have been as cruel as the Latin Christians. The defeat of Byzantium, already in a state of decline, accelerated political degeneration so that the Byzantines eventually became an easy prey to the Turks. The Crusading movement thus resulted, ultimately, in the victory of Islam, a result which was of course the exact opposite of its original intention.

Meanwhile, the Latin Empire of Constantinople was established, and Byzantine refugees founded their own successor states, the most notable of these being the Empire of Nicaea under Theodore Lascaris (a relative of Alexius III), the Empire of Trebizond, and the Despotate of Epirus.

The new seat of the Patriarchate was established in the city of Nicaea until in 1261, when Constantinople was reconquered by the Byzantine Emperor Michael VIII Palaiologos.

Fall of Constantinople in 1453 and Ottoman period

In accordance with the traditional custom at the time, Sultan Mehmed II allowed his troops and his entourage three full days of unbridled pillage and looting in the city shortly after it was captured. Once the three days passed, he would then claim its remaining contents for himself. However, by the end of the first day, he proclaimed that the looting should cease as he felt profound sadness when he toured the looted and enslaved city.  Hagia Sophia was not exempted from the pillage and looting and specifically became its focal point as the invaders believed it to contain the greatest treasures and valuables of the city. Shortly after the defence of the Walls of Constantinople collapsed and the Ottoman troops entered the city victoriously, the pillagers and looters made their way to the Hagia Sophia and battered down its doors before storming in.

Throughout the period of the siege of Constantinople, the trapped worshippers of the city participated in the Divine Liturgy and the Prayer of the Hours at the Hagia Sophia and the church formed a safe-haven and a refuge for many of those who were unable to contribute to the city's defence, which comprised women, children, elderly, the sick and the wounded. Being trapped in the church, the many congregants and yet more refugees inside became spoils-of-war to be divided amongst the triumphant invaders. The building was desecrated and looted, with the helpless occupants who sought shelter within the church being enslaved. While most of the elderly and the infirm/wounded and sick were killed, and the remainder (mainly teenage males and young boys) were chained up and sold into slavery.

The women of Constantinople also suffered from rape at the hands of Ottoman forces. According to Barbaro, "all through the day the Turks made a great slaughter of Christians through the city". According to historian Philip Mansel, widespread persecution of the city's civilian inhabitants took place, resulting in thousands of murders and rapes, and 30,000 civilians being enslaved or forcibly deported. George Sphrantzes says that people of both genders were raped inside Hagia Sophia.

After Constantinople was overrun by the Ottoman Turks in 1453, the Patriarchate came to care more directly for all the Orthodox living in the Ottoman Empire. Mehmed II appointed Gennadios II Scholarios as the Patriarch in 1454 and designated him as the spiritual leader as well as the ethnarch or, in Turkish, milletbashi of all the Orthodox Christians in the Empire, regardless of ethnic origin; not only Greeks, but also Bulgarians, Serbs, Albanians, Wallachians, Moldavians, Croatis, Syrians, orthodox Arabs, Georgians and Lazs came under the spiritual, administrative, fiscal, cultural and legal jurisdiction of the Patriarchate. Some of the other patriarchs came at various points to live permanently in Constantinople and function as part of the local church government. This situation, according to some of the Orientalists and historians, shows the Pax Ottomana (or Pax Ottomanica, literally "the Ottoman Peace").

The Russian Orthodox Church, which for centuries had been a diocese of the Ecumenical Patriarchate, declared its independence in 1448 shortly before Constantinople fell owing to its protest over the Council of Florence, in which representatives of the patriarchate had signed onto union with Rome, trading doctrinal concessions for military aid against the encroaching Ottomans. The military aid never came and those concessions were subsequently repudiated by the patriarchate but, from 1448, the Russian church came to function independently. Within decades after the Fall of Constantinople to Mehmed II of the Ottoman Empire on 29 May 1453, some were nominating Moscow as the "Third Rome", or the "New Rome". In 1589, 141 years later, Constantinople came to recognize Russia's independence and led the Eastern Orthodox Church in declaring Russia also to be a patriarchate, numbering Moscow's bishop as fifth in rank behind the ancient patriarchates. The Russian Orthodox Church became the largest of the Eastern Orthodox churches in the world.

As Ottoman rule weakened, various parts of the Orthodox Church that had been under the direct influence of the Ecumenical Patriarchate came to be independent. These churches at first usually declared their independence without universal approval, which came after Constantinople gave its blessing. The rate at which these new autocephalous ("self-headed") churches came into being increased in the 19th century, particularly with the independence of Greece.

In 1833, the Church of Greece declared its autocephaly, which was subsequently recognized by the patriarchate in 1850. In 1865, the Romanian Orthodox Church, against the protests of Constantinople, declared its independence, which was acknowledged in 1885. A year before Greece's autocephaly was self-proclaimed, the Serbian Orthodox Church was named autocephalous by the local secular government but Constantinople refused recognition until 1879. In 1860 the Bulgarians  seceded from the Ecumenical Patriarchate; in 1870 the Bulgarian church was politically recognized as autonomous under the name Bulgarian Exarchate by the Sultan's firman, but it was not until 1945 that it was recognized by the Ecumenical Patriarchate. In 1922, the Albanian Orthodox Church declared its autocephaly, being granted recognition of it in 1937.

In addition to these churches, whose territory had been agreed upon by all as within Constantinople's jurisdiction, several other disputed areas' Eastern Orthodox churches have had recognition by the Ecumenical Patriarchate as either autocephalous or autonomous, including the Finnish Orthodox Church and Estonian Orthodox Church in 1923, the Polish Orthodox Church in 1924, and the Czech and Slovak Orthodox Church in 1998. The majority of these disputes are a result of the expansion of the Russian Empire, which often included a subjugation of the Orthodox churches in conquered lands to the Moscow Patriarchate. Due to this, the Moscow Patriarchate often disputes the Ecumenical Patriarch's role as prime representative and spiritual leader of the world's Orthodox Christians, citing that it represents the numerically largest Orthodox community.

Ecclesiastical buildings in Ottoman cities
As a ruling institution, the Ottoman Empire brought regulations on how the cities would be built (quality reassurances) and how the architecture (structural integrity, social needs, etc.) should be shaped. Special restrictions were imposed concerning the construction, renovation, size and usage of bells in churches. For example, in a town a church should not be larger in size than the largest mosque. Some churches were destroyed (e.g. the Church of the Holy Apostles), many were converted into mosques (among them the Hagia Sophia and Chora Church in Constantinople, and the Rotunda and Hagios Demetrios in Thessaloniki) or served for other uses (e.g. Hagia Irene in Constantinople, which became an armory for the Janissaries, and the Gül Mosque [Hagia Theodosia or Christ Euergetes], also in Constantinople, which after the Conquest served for a while as a naval dockyard). Such rules, however, although very strict in the beginning, with time and the increasing importance in the Ottoman Empire of the Rum millet were more and more disregarded, so that in the 19th century in Istanbul there was a veritable building boom of Orthodox churches, many among them having high bell towers and brick domes, both of which had previously been strictly prohibited.

Patriarchate under the secular Republic of Turkey

Since 1586 the Ecumenical Patriarchate has had its headquarters in the relatively modest Church of St George in the Fener (Phanar) district of Istanbul. The current territory of the Patriarchate is significantly reduced from what it was at its height. Its canonical territory currently includes most of modern Turkey, northern Greece and Mount Athos, the Dodecanese and Crete. By its interpretation of Canon 28 of Chalcedon, Constantinople also claims jurisdiction over all areas outside the canonically defined territories of other Orthodox churches, which includes the entire Western hemisphere, Oceania, the United Kingdom, Western Europe, Northeast Asia, Southeast Asia. This claim is disputed by other autocephalous churches with dioceses in those areas, as well as the Turkish government.

The Orthodox presence in Turkey itself is small; however the majority of Orthodox in North America (about two-thirds) are under the Ecumenical Patriarchate, primarily in the Greek Orthodox Archdiocese of America. The Patriarchate also enjoys an even greater majority in the United Kingdom. Furthermore, the Albanian, Rusyn and Ukrainian jurisdictions in America are also part of the Patriarchate.

Most of the Patriarchate's funding does not come directly from its member churches but rather from the government of Greece, due to an arrangement whereby the Patriarchate had transferred property it had owned to Greece. In exchange, the employees, including the clergy, of the Patriarchate are remunerated by the Greek government. The Greek Orthodox Archdiocese of America provides substantial support through an annual contribution, known as the logia, and its institutions, including the American-based Greek Orthodox Ladies Philoptochos Society and the Archons of the Ecumenical Patriarchate, usually important laymen who make large donations for the upkeep of the Patriarchate. In turn, they are granted honorary titles which once belonged to members of the Patriarchal staff in centuries past.

The Patriarchate acts in the capacity of being an intermediary and facilitator between the Orthodox churches and also in relations with other Christians and religions. This role sometimes brings the Patriarchate into conflict with other Orthodox churches, as its role in the church is debated. The question centers around whether the Ecumenical Patriarchate is simply the most honored among the Orthodox churches or whether it has any real authority or prerogatives that differ from the other autocephalous churches. This dispute is often between Constantinople and Moscow, the largest Orthodox church in terms of population, especially as expressed in the Third Rome theory which places Moscow in the place of Constantinople as the center of world Orthodoxy. Such disputes sometimes result in temporary breaks in full communion, though usually not for very long.

The relationship between Constantinople and the Ottoman Empire was frequently bitter, due in no small part to the privilege given to Islam. In the secular Republic of Turkey, tensions are still constant. Turkey requires by law that the Patriarch be a Turkish citizen by birth, which all Patriarchs have been since 1923—all ethnic Greeks from the minuscule and steadily decreasing Greek minority of Turkey, which is causing a shortage of priests and consequently potential candidates for the post of Ecumenical Patriarch. The state's expropriation of church property and the closing of the Orthodox Theological School of Halki are also difficulties faced by the Patriarchate.

Administration and structure

Holy Synod
The affairs of the patriarchate are conducted by the Holy Synod, presided over by the Ecumenical Patriarch. The synod has existed since some time prior to the fourth century and assists the patriarch in determining the affairs of the possessions under his jurisdiction. The synod first developed from what was referred to as the resident synod, composed of the patriarch, local bishops, and any Orthodox bishops who were visiting in the imperial capital of Constantinople. After the fall of Constantinople, the synod's membership became limited to bishops of the patriarchate.

The Holy and Sacred Synod, presided over by His All-Holiness Ecumenical Patriarch Bartholomew I, is composed of twelve hierarchs, each serving a year-long term, with half of the synod's members changing every six months in March and September.

The current members of the Holy and Sacred Synod serving from March 1, 2021 – August 31, 2021, are as follows:
 Emmanuel of Chalcedon
 Dimitrios of Metres and Athyra
 Ambrosios of Karpathos and Kasos
 Apostolos of Miletus
 Alexios of Atlanta
 Joseph of Prokonnesos
 Meliton of Philadelphia
 Joseph of Buenos Aires
 Cleopas of Sweden and all Scandinavia
 Maximos of Silyvria
 Makarios of Australia
 Cyril of Imbros and Tenedos

Notable hierarchs of the Ecumenical Patriarchate are the popular writer Kallistos (Timothy) Ware, an assistant-bishop in the Archdiocese of Thyateira and author of The Orthodox Church, the best-known introduction to the Orthodox Church in English, and John Zizioulas, Metropolitan of Pergamon, a well-known professor of Systematic Theology.

The right of non-Turkish members of the synod (from Northern Greece, the Dodecanese, America and Western Europe) to convene appears to be threatened by a recent declaration from the Istanbul Governor reported in the Freiburg archdiocesan magazine.

Structure

Head of the Patriarchate of Constantinople and of the Holy Synod is the Archbishop of Constantinople, New Rome and Ecumenical Patriarch and  who since 1991 has been Bartholomew I. The local churches of the Ecumenical Patriarchate consist of six archdioceses, 66 metropolises, 2 dioceses and one exarchate, each of which reports directly to the Patriarch of Constantinople with no intervening authority.

Archdioceses and Archbishops 

Archdiocese of Constantinople and New Rome (Patriarchal archdiocese):
Metropolis of Chalcedon: Emmanuel Adamakis (2021–)
Metropolis of Derkoi: Apostolos Daniilidis (2011–)
Metropolis of Imbros and Tenedos: Cyril Dragounis (2002–2020), Cyril Sykis (2020–)
Metropolis of the Princes' Islands: Dimitrios Kommatas (2018–)
Metropolis of Pisidia: Sotirios Trambas (2008–2022)
Metropolis of Prusa: Ioakeim Billis (2021–)
Metropolis of Smyrna: Bartholomew Samaras (2016–)
Metropolis of Adrianopolis: Amfilochios of Adrianoupolis
Metropolis of Karpathos and Kasos: Ambrosios Panagiotidis (1983–)
Metropolis of Kos and Nisyros: Nathaniel II (Philippos) Diakopanagiotis (2009–)
Metropolis of Leros, Kalymnos and Astypalaia and Exarchate of the Southern Sporades: Païsios (Panagiotis) Aravantinos (2005–)
Metropolis of Rhodes: Cyril II (Konstantinos) Kogerakis (2004–)
Metropolis of Syme: Chrysostomos Pitsis (2018–)
Exarchate of Patmos: Archimandrite Cyril Pentes 
Exarchate of Malta: Metropolitan Kyrillos Katerelos (2021–)

Spiritually assigned to the Ecumenical Patriarchate by the Patriarchal and Synodic Act of 4 September 1928:

Metropolis of Alexandroupolis Anthimos Koukouridis (2004–)
Metropolis of Chios, Psara and Inousses: Markos Basilakis (2011–)
Metropolis of Didymoteichon and Orestias: Damaskinos (Minas) Karpathakis (2009–)
Metropolis of Drama: Dorotheos Paparis (2022–)
Metropolis of Dryinoupolis, Pogoniani and Konitsa: Andreas Trempelas (1995–)
Metropolis of Edessa, Pella and Almopia: Joel (Panagiotis) Phrankakos (2002–)
Metropolis of Elassona: Hariton Toumbas(2014-)
Metropolis of Eleftheroupolis: Chrysostomos Abagianos (2004–)
Metropolis of Florina, Prespes and Eordaia: Theoklitos (Thomas) Passalis (2000–)
Metropolis of Goumenissa, Axioupoli and Polykastro: Dimitrios Bekiaris (1989–)
Metropolis of Grevena: David Tzioumakas (2014-)
Metropolis of Ierissos, Mount Athos and Ardameri: Theoklitos Athanasopoulos (2012–)
Metropolis of Ioannina:Maximos Papagiannis(2014-)
Metropolis of Kassandria: Nikodemos (Konstatinos) Korakis (2001–)
Metropolis of Kastoria: Kallinikos Georgatos(2021-)
Metropolis of Kitros, Katerini and Platamonas: Georgios Chrysostomou(2014-)
Metropolis of Langadas, Liti and Rentina: Platon Crikris(2021-)
Metropolis of Lemnos and Agios Efstratios: Hierotheos Calogeropoulos(2019–)
Metropolis of Maronia and Komotini: Panteleimon Moutafis(2013-)
Metropolis of Mithymna: Chrysostomos Kalamatianos (1984–)
Metropolis of Mytilini, Eresos and Plomari: Iakobos Frantzes(1988–)
Metropolis of Neapolis and Stavroupolis: Barnabas Tyris (2004–)
Metropolis of Nea Krini and Kalamaria: Ioustinos Bardakas(2015-)
Metropolis of Nea Zichni and Nevrokopion: Hierotheos (Dimitrios) Tsoliakos (2003–)
Metropolis of Nicopolis and Preveza: Meletios Kalamaras (1980–2012), Chrysostom Tsirigas (2012-)
Metropolis of Paramythia, Filiates, Giromeri and Parga: Titos (Sotirios) Papanakos (1974–)
Metropolis of Philippi, Neapolis and Thasos: Prokopios Tsakoumakas (1974–2017), Stefanos Tolios(2017-)
Metropolis of Polyani and Kilkis: Emmanuel Sigalas (2009–2021),Vartholomeos Antoniou-Triantafyllides(2021-)
Metropolis of Samos and Ikaria: Eusebios (Evangelos) Pistolis (1995–)
Metropolis of Serres and Nigrita: Theologos (Ioannis) Apostolidis (2001–)
Metropolis of Servia and Kozani: Paulos Papalexiou (2004–)
Metropolis of Siderokastron: Makarios (Sotirios) Philotheou (2001–)
Metropolis of Sisanion and Siatista: Paulos (2006–2019), Athanasios Giannousas (2019-)
Metropolis of Thessaloniki: Anthimos (Dionysios) Roussas (1974–)
Metropolis of Veria and Naousa: Panteleimon (Ioannis) Kalpakidis (1994–)
Metropolis of Xanthi and Peritheorion: Panteleimon (Mikhael) Kalaphatis (1995–)
Archdiocese of Crete (Heraklion): Eirinaios Athanasiadis (2006–2021), Evgenios Antonopoulos(2022-)
Metropolis of Gortyna and Arkadia and Exarchate of Middle Crete: Makarios Douloufakis (2005–)
Metropolis of Rethymnon and Avlopotamos and Exarchate of Upper Crete: Prodromos Xenakes(2022-);
Metropolis of Kydonia and Apokoronos: Damaskinos Papagiannakis (2006–)
Metropolis of Lampi, Syvritos, and Sfakia: Eirinaios (Nikolaos) Mesarchakis (1990–)
Metropolis of Ierapytna and Siteia and Exarchate of Eastern Crete: Cyrillos Diamantakes(2016-)
Metropolis of Petra and Cherronisos: Nektarios Papadakis (1990–2015), Gerasimos Marmatakes(2015–)
Metropolis of Kissamos and Selino: Amphilochios Andronikakis (2005–)
Metropolis of Arkalochorion, Kastelion and Viannos: Andreas Nanakis (2001–)
Archdiocese of Canada and Exarchate of the Arctic (Toronto): Sotirios Athanasoulas (1979–)
Archdiocese of Italy and Exarchate of Southern Europe (Venice): Polycarpos Stavropoulos (2021–)
Archdiocese of Thyateira and Great Britain (London, includes the UK, Ireland and the Crown dependencies): Nikitas Loulias (2019–)
Archdiocese of Australia and Exarchate of Papua New Guinea: Makarios Griniezakis (2019–)
Archdiocesan District of Adelaide, South Australia and the Northern Territory
Archdiocesan District of Brisbane, Queensland and Papua New Guinea
Archdiocesan District of Canberra, southern New South Wales and Tasmania
Archdiocesan District of Melbourne and Victoria
Archdiocesan District of Northcote
Archdiocesan District of Perth and Western Australia
Archdiocesan District of Sydney and New South Wales
Archdiocese of America and Exarchate of the Atlantic and Pacific Oceans (headquartered in New York City): Elpidoforos Lampriniadis (2019–)
Metropolis of Chicago: Nathanael Symeonides (2018–)
Metropolis of New Jersey: Vacant (Administrator: Archbishop Elpidophoros of America)
Metropolis of Atlanta: Alexios Panagiotopoulos (1999–)
Metropolis of Denver: Isaiah Chronopoulos (1992–)
Metropolis of Pittsburgh: Savas Zembillas (2012–)
Metropolis of Boston: Methodios (Georgios) Tournas (1984–)
Metropolis of Detroit: Nicholas Pissaris (1999–)
Metropolis of San Francisco: Gerasimos Michaleas (2005–)

Metropolises and Metropolitans 

Metropolis of Austria and Exarchate of Hungary and Middle Europe (Vienna): Arsenios Kardamakis (2011–)
Metropolis of Belgium, Orthodox Archdiocese of Belgium and exarchate of the Netherlands and Luxembourg (Brussels): Athenagoras (Yves) Peckstadt (2013–)
Metropolis of France (Paris): Dimitrios Ploumes (2021-)
Metropolis of Germany (Bonn): Augustinos Labardakis (1980–)
Metropolis of Sweden and all Scandinavia and Exarchate of the Northern Countries (Stockholm): Cleopas Strongylis (2014–)
Metropolis of Spain and Portugal (Madrid): Visarion Comzias (2021-)
Metropolis of Switzerland (Chambésy, Geneva): Maximos Pothos (2018-)
Metropolis of Buenos Aires and Exarchate of All South America: Joseph Bosch (2019-)
Metropolis of Mexico and Exarchate of All Central America and the Caribbean: Athenagoras (Georgios) Anastasiadis (1996–)
Metropolis of Hong Kong and Southeast Asia and Exarchate of the Philippines: Nektarios (Tsilis) (2008–)
Metropolis of Korea and Exarchate of All the Upper East (Seoul): Ambrosios (Aristotelis) Zografos (2008–)
Metropolis of New Zealand and Exarchate of All Oceania (Wellington): Myron Ktistakis (2018–)
Metropolis of Singapore and South Asia: Konstantinos Tsilis (2011–)
Metropolis of Winnipeg and Central Canada (Ukrainian Orthodox Church of Canada): vacant (acting: Bishop Ilarion of Edmonton)
Diocese of Toronto and Eastern Canada: Andrew (Peshko) of Toronto) (2021-)
Diocese of Edmonton and Western Canada: Hilarion (Rudnyk) (2008–)
Metropolis of Western Europe (Ukrainian Orthodox Church): John Derevianka (1991–)
Metropolis of Eastern Eparchy (Ukrainian Orthodox Church of the USA): Antonios Scharba (1995–)
Diocese of Western Eparchy (Chicago): Pamphylos Daniel Zelinsky (2009–)

Dioceses and Bishops 

Diocese of America (Albanian Orthodox church): Philomelion Elias Katre (2002–2022+)
Diocese of North America (American Carpatho-Russian Orthodox church): Nyssa Gregory (Tatsis) (2012–)

Titular archdioceses 
Archdiocese of Komana and All Cappadocia: Michael Anisenko(2020-)
Archdiocese of Hierapolis: Antonios Sarba (1995–present)
Archdiocese of Thyatira: Nikitas Loulias (2019–present)

Titular metropolises 

Metropolis of Caesarea: Vacant
Metropolis of Ephesus: Vacant
Metropolis of Heraclea and Exarchate of Thrace: Vacant
Metropolis of Cyzicus: Vacant
Metropolis of Nicomedia: Joachim (Elias) Nerantzoulis (2008–); former metropolitan of Chalcedon
Metropolis of Nicaea and Exarchate of Bithynia: John V Rinne (2001–2010; former archbishop of Karelia and all Finland); Constantinos Charisiadis (2011–2021)
Metropolis of Aenos: Vacant
Metropolis of Amasya and Exarchate of All Euxinous Pontus: Vacant
Metropolis of Hadrianopolis: Damaskinos Papandreou (2003-2011); former metropolitan of Switzerland; Amphilochios Stergiou (2014–)
Metropolis of Anea: Makarios Pavlidis (2018-)
Metropolis of Ankyra and Exarchate of All Galatia: Ieremias Kalligiorgis (2018-)
Metropolis of Augustopolis: Vacant
Metropolis of Chaldia, Cheriana and Kerasous and Exarchate of Helenopontus: Vacant
Metropolis of Crine and Exarchate of Ionia: Kyrillos Katerelos(2021-)
Metropolis of Cydonies: Athenagoras Hrysanes(2012-)
Metropolis of the Dardanelles and Exarchate of All Hellespontus:Vacant
Metropolis of Eucarpia: Bishop Ierotheos Zaharis (2017-)
Metropolis of Euchaita: Vacant
Metropolis of Eudoxias: Bishop Amvrosios Horozides (2019-)
Metropolis of Ganos and Chora and All the Thracian Coast: Amphilochios Tsoukos (2018–2022,resigned)
Metropolis of Helioupolis and Theira and Exarchate of All Caria: Vacant, 
Metropolis of Helenopolis: Vacant
Metropolis of Kolonia: Athanasios Theoharous (2021-)
Metropolis of Iconium and Exarchate of Lycaonia: Theoleptos (Jacob) Fenerlis (2000–)
Metropolis of Kallipolis and Madytos: Stephanos Ntinides (2011–)
Metropolis of Laodicea and Exarchate of Phrygia: Theodoritos Polyzoyopoulos(2018-)
Metropolis of Lititsa: Vacant
Metropolis of Lystra: Vacant
Metropolis of Metres and Athyra: Dimitrios Grollios (2020-)
Metropolis of Melitene:Bishop Maximos Pafilis (2018-)
Metropolis of Miletus: Apostolos Voulgaris (1990–)
Metropolis of Moschonisia and Exarchate of Aeolis: Cyril Dragounis  (2020-)
Metropolis of Myra: Chrysostomos Kalaitzis (1995–)
Metropolis of Myriophyton and Peristasis: Irinaios Ioannidis (2000–)
Metropolis of Neocaesaria and Exarchate of Pontus Polemoniacus: Vacant
Metropolis of Pergamon and Adramyttion: John II Zizioulas (1986–)
Metropolis of Perge and Exarchate of Pamphylia: Vacant
Metropolis of Philadelphia and Exarchate of Lydia: Meliton (Dimitrios) Karras (1990–)
Metropolis of Pisidia and Exarchate of Side, Myra and Attalia: Sotirios Trambas (2008–2022+died),now:Job Getcha;
Metropolis of Prokonnesos and Exarchate of All Propontis: Joseph (Emmanuel) Charkiolakis (2008–); former metropolitan of New Zealand
Metropolis of Prousa:Ioakeim Billis (2021-)
Metropolis of Rhodopolis: Tarasios Antonopoulos (2019-)
Metropolis of Saranta Ecclesies: Andreas Sofianopoulos(2021-)
Metropolis of Sardis: Evangelos Courounis (2021-)
Metropolis of Sasima and Cappadocia Secunda: Bishop Constantine Moralis(2022-)
Metropolis of Sebasteia and Exarchate of All Paphlagonia: Seraphim Ginis (2019–)
Metropolis of Seleucia and Pamphylia: Vacant
Metropolis of Silyvria: Maximos Vgenopoulos (2014–)
Metropolis of Smyrna and Exarchate of All Asia Minor: Bartholomeos Samaras (2016–)
Metropolis of Traianopolis: Vacant
Metropolis of Trapezous and Exarchate of Lazica: Vacant
Metropolis of Troas:Bishop Petros Bozinis (2015-)
Metropolis of Tyana: Vacant
Metropolis of Tyroloi and Serention: Vacant
Metropolis of Bizye and Medea: Vacant
Metropolis of Vryoula and Erythrae: Panteleimon Sklavos (2018-)

Titular dioceses 

Diocese of Abydos: Gregorios Tsoutsoules (2022-)
Diocese of Amorion: Nikiforos Psihloudes (2014-)
Diocese of Andidon:Vacant
Diocese of Apamea: Païsios Larentzakis (2018-)
Diocese of Arianzos: Vartholomeos (Ioannis) Kessidis (2004–)
Diocese of Ariste: Vasileios Tsiopanas (1976–)
Diocese of Aspendos: Jeremy Ferens (1995–)
Diocese of Claudiopolis: Iakovos Savva (2021-)
Diocese of Christoupolis: Emmanuel Sfiatkos (2020-) 
Diocese of Cyneae: Elpidios Karelis (2020–)
Diocese of Dervis: Ezekiel Kefalas (1977–)
Diocese of Dioclea: Kallistos Ware (1982–2022)
Diocese of Dorylaeum: Damaskenos Lionakis (2019-)
Diocese of Eumeneia: Maximos (Ioannis) Mastihis (1977–2015), Irinaeos Verykakis (2019-)
Diocese of Halicarnassus: Adrianos Sergakis (2015-)
Diocese of Irenopolis: Nikandros Palyvos (2019-)
Diocese of Kratea: Georgios Antonopoulos(2022-)
Diocese of Lampsacus: Vacant
Diocese of Lefki: Eumenios Tamiolakis (1994–)
Diocese of Meloa: Aimilianos Coutouzes (2019–)
Diocese of Mokissos: Demetrios Kantzavelos (2006–)
Diocese of Olympos: Anthimos Drakonakis (1992-2015+),Kyrillos Papanthimou(2017-)
Diocese of Pamphylos: Daniel Zelinsky (2008–)
Diocese of Parnassus: John Derevianka (1995–)
Diocese of Phasiane: Antonios Paropoulos (2002–)
Diocese of Philomelion: Elias Katre (2002–2022)
Diocese of Sinope: Silouan Fotineas (2020–)
Diocese of Synnada: Dionysios (Charalampos) Sakatis (1996–2021)
Diocese of Telmessos: Vacant
Diocese of Theoupolis: Vacant
Diocese of Troas: Petros Bozines (2015-)
Diocese of Tropaeon: Vacant
Diocese of Zelon: Sevastianos Skordallos (2012–)

Historical Archdioceses

Archdiocese of Syracuse
Archdiocese of Russian Orthodox churches in Western Europe—Exarchate for Orthodox Parishes of Russian Tradition in Western Europe (Paris) (disestablished 2018)

Historical Metropolises 

Metropolis of Anchialos
Metropolis of Balgrad, one of founding archdioceses of Romanian Orthodox Church
Metropolis of Calabria
Metropolis of Devròn and Velissus, under jurisdiction of the Ecumenical Patriarchate from 1767 to 1920
Metropolis of Gothia and Caffa (liquidated by the Russian Orthodox Church in 1779, see Annexation of Crimea by the Russian Empire)
Metropolis of Kamianets (Podolia Eyalet)
Metropolis of Kolonia
Metropolis of Kyiv (988–2019)
 Metropolis of Kiev, Galicia and all Ruthenia (1620–1722)
Metropolis of Halych (1303–1347), succeeded and reintegrated back into Metropolis of Kyiv
Metropolis of Lithuania (1317–1435), succeeded and reintegrated back into Metropolis of Kyiv
Metropolis of Miletopolis: Iakovos Tsigounis (2011–)
Metropolis of Melenikon
Metropolis of Moldo-Wallachia (Metropolis of Moldavia and Bukovina), one of founding archdioceses of Romanian Orthodox Church
Metropolis of Monastirion and Pelagonia, under jurisdiction of the Ecumenical Patriarchate from 1767 to 1920
Metropolis of Nevrokopion
Metropolis of Philippopolis
Metropolis of Prèspes and Achrida, under jurisdiction of the Ecumenical Patriarchate from 1767 to 1920
 (Ottoman Ukraine)
Metropolis of Raskopresrèna, under jurisdiction of the Ecumenical Patriarchate from 1766 to 1920
Metropolis of Riga and All Latvia
Metropolis of Skopia, under jurisdiction of the Ecumenical Patriarchate from 1766 to 1920
Metropolis of Sozopolis (and later Sozoagathopolis)
Metropolis of Stromnitsa, under jurisdiction of the Ecumenical Patriarchate from 1767 to 1920
Metropolis of Ugro-Wallachia (Metropolis of Muntenia and Dobrudja), one of founding archdioceses of Romanian Orthodox Church
Metropolis of Vanialuka, under jurisdiction of the Ecumenical Patriarchate from 1900 to 1920
Metropolis of Varna
Metropolis of Vellègradon, under jurisdiction of the Ecumenical Patriarchate from 1766 to 1879
Metropolis of Nissa, under jurisdiction of the Ecumenical Patriarchate from 1766 to 1879
Metropolis of Vosna, under jurisdiction of the Ecumenical Patriarchate from 1766 to 1920
Metropolis of Svornikion, under jurisdiction of the Ecumenical Patriarchate from 1766 to 1920

Historical Dioceses 

Diocese of Agia and Sykourion
Diocese of Agrafa and Litza
Diocese of Amphipolis
Diocese of Amylcae
Diocese of Christianoupolis
Diocese of Angon
Diocese of Argyropolis
Diocese of Agathopolis
Diocese of Agathonicea
Diocese of Katania
Diocese of Konstantia
Diocese of Daphnusia
Diocese of Dodona
Diocese of Elaea
Diocese of Kampania
Diocese of Meloe
Diocese of Messene
Diocese of Myrina
Diocese of Nyssa
Diocese of Petra
Diocese of Platamon and Lykostomion
Diocese of Ravenna
Diocese of Skopelos
Diocese of Talantion
Diocese of Thermia and Kea
Diocese of Trachaea
Diocese of Vilna

Stauropegions 

Stauropegion of St. Andrew's Church in Kyiv: Bishop Michael (Anischenko) (2019–)
Kyiv Pechersk Lavra (1589–1686)
Lviv Dormition Brotherhood (1589–1709)
Kyiv Epiphany Brotherhood (1620–1686)
Manyava Skete (1620–1785)
Exaltation of the Cross Lutsk Brotherhood (1623–????)
Mezhyhirya Monastery (1609–1703)

Present-day autocephalous churches previously under the Ecumenical Patriarchate

Armenian Apostolic Church; autocephaly granted in 554.
Bulgarian Orthodox Church; autocephaly granted in 870; autocephaly re-recognised in 1235 and 1945.
Russian Orthodox Church; autocephaly recognized in 1589.
Church of Greece (Archdiocese of Athens and All Greece); autocephaly recognised in 1850.
Serbian Orthodox Church; autocephaly granted in 1219; abolished in 1463 and 1766, re-recognized in 1557 and 1879.
Romanian Orthodox Church; autocephaly recognized in 1885.
Polish Autocephalous Orthodox Church; autocephaly recognised in 1924 by the Ecumenical Patriarchate of Constantinople and in 1948 by the Russian Orthodox Church.
Orthodox Autocephalous Church of Albania (Archdiocese of Tirana, Durrës and All Albania); autocephaly recognised in 1937.
Orthodox Church of the Czech Lands and Slovakia (Metropolis of Prague, Czech Lands and Slovakia); autocephaly recognised in 1951 by the Russian Orthodox Church and in 1998 by the Ecumenical Patriarchate of Constantinople.
Orthodox Church of Ukraine; intention to grant autocephaly announced in 2018. Rejected by the Russian Orthodox Church, the Polish Orthodox Church, and the Serbian Orthodox Church. The Ecumenical Patriarchate granted autocephaly to the Orthodox Church of Ukraine on 5 January 2019.

References

Citations

Sources 
This article incorporates text from several articles on OrthodoxWiki:
 OrthodoxWiki:Byzantine response to OCA autocephaly
 OrthodoxWiki:Church of Constantinople
 OrthodoxWiki:Mount Athos
 OrthodoxWiki:Prerogatives of the Ecumenical Patriarchate

Literature

External links 
 Official website
 Patriarchs of Constantinople
 Article on the Ecumenical Patriarchate by Ronald Roberson on the website of CNEWA, a papal agency for humanitarian and pastoral support

 
Dioceses established in the 1st century